Vieuxtemps may refer to:
 Henri Vieuxtemps, Belgian composer and violinist
 Vieuxtemps Guarneri, violin built by the renowned Italian instrument maker Giuseppe Guarneri